Pashagh-e Jadid (also Romanized as Pāshagh-e Jadīd; also known as Pāshagh) is a village in Ahmadi Rural District, Ahmadi District, Hajjiabad County, Hormozgan Province, Iran. At the 2006 census, its population was 534, in 119 families.

References 

Populated places in Hajjiabad County